The Corsican painted frog (Discoglossus montalentii) is a species of frogs in the family Alytidae (formerly Discoglossidae).

It is endemic to the French island of Corsica. Its natural habitats are temperate forests and rivers.

Description 
The Corsican painted frog is very similar in appearance to the Tyrrhenian painted frog but has a noticeably more rounded snout and a flatter back. The fourth finger of its front foot is tapering and not spatulate, and its hind legs are longer. The colour varies and is either plain brown, grey or reddish brown, or one of these colours with dark brown spots. The underside is pale. The call is more musical than other painted frogs and consists of a repeated "poop – poop – poop".

Distribution and habitat 
The Corsican painted frog is found only on the island of Corsica. It shares its range with the Tyrrhenian painted frog ((Discoglossus sardus)) but is a more montane species, adept at leaping from rock to rock.

Biology 
Like other members of its family, the Corsican painted frog eats small invertebrates. It is unclear whether observations of this frog in the past were of D. sardus or D. montalentii. This is because they are so similar in appearance and were only recognised as different species in the late 20th century. Consequently, its reproductive habits are uncertain but it is believed to lay its eggs in small groups or singly on the bottom of watercourses.

References 

Discoglossus
Amphibians of Europe
Endemic fauna of Corsica
Amphibians described in 1984
Taxonomy articles created by Polbot